The 1935 Australian Championships was a tennis tournament that took place on outdoor grass courts at the Kooyong Stadium in Melbourne, Australia, from 1 to 14 January. It was the 28th edition of the Australian Championships (now known as the Australian Open), the 8th held in Melbourne, and the first Grand Slam tournament of the year. Australian Jack Crawford and Dorothy Round from England won the singles titles.

Finals

Men's singles

 Jack Crawford defeated   Fred Perry  2–6, 6–4, 6–4, 6–4

Women's singles

 Dorothy Round defeated   Nancy Lyle  1–6, 6–1, 6–3

Men's doubles

 Jack Crawford /  Vivian McGrath defeated  Pat Hughes /   Fred Perry 6–4, 8–6, 6–2

Women's doubles

 Evelyn Dearman /  Nancy Lyle defeated  Louie Bickerton /  Nell Hall Hopman  6–3, 6–4

Mixed doubles

 Louie Bickerton /  Christian Boussus defeated  Birdie Bond /  Vernon Kirby 1–6, 6–3, 6–3

Notes

References

External links
 Australian Open official website

1935
1935 in Australian tennis
January 1935 sports events